The Final Executioner is an Italian post-apocalyptic film released in 1984.

Synopsis

The resulting fallout from a nuclear war has contaminated most of the cities except for a few isolated towns. The remaining society is divided into clean and contaminated people.

Those "convicted" of being contaminated are moved to preserves for hunting by the elites - those ruled clean. An elite group has taken up the sport of hunting the contaminated people, and have killed almost 80 million.

Alan, an elite cybernetic expert (William Mang) tries to put a stop to this, as his wife is soon to be one of those being hunted. For attempting to reveal what's really happening, he is stripped of his privileges and sent to a preserve. Alan is forced to watch several of the deprivations of the hunters, and after being shot falls into a river.

He ends up in the home of an ex-cop Woody Strode and receives training from him. Alan and the cop then invade the citadel of the hunters.

A bloodbath ensues.

Cast

William Mang 	... 	Alan Tanner

Marina Costa 	... 	Edra

Harrison Muller 	... 	Erasmus

Woody Strode 	... 	Sam

Margie Newton 	... 	Diane (as Margi Newton)

Stefano Davanzati 	... 	Melvin

Renato Miracco 	... 	Louis

Maria Romano 	... 	Magda

Luca Giordana 	... 	Phil

Karl Zinny 	... 	Evan, the Boy

Cinzia Bonfantini 	... 	Alan's Wife

Giovanni Cianfriglia 	... 	Walker

Production
A certain amount of footage from this film was used in a later film The Bronx Executioner. Woody Strode's footage as the character Sam is re-used in The Bronx Executioner, and his character  is called Warren. Margit Evelyn Newton was the only actor from this film to have new scenes shot in the second.

Reception
In a retrospective review, Jeremy Wheeler of AllMovie commented that despite the film having a "leather-clad, big-haired warrior on a sleek, black motorcycle carrying a samurai sword on the barren dunes of the future" sounding "genius enough" the film still contained "all the pitfalls of the cheap Italian post-apocalyptic flicks of this time with little of the gratuitous nature that the best of the bunch have been graced with." Kim Newman found this movie to be the "best of a bad lot" of the group of cheap, Italian post apocalyptic movies of the 1980s. Creature Feature gave the movies 1.5 out of 5 stars, noting that the violence on both sides makes it hard to feel empathy for Mang and that the direction was lacking elan. TV Guide found the movie to better than most of the genre, and the Strode's performance was impressive, but gave the movie one of five stars labeling it a time killer.

See also
 Woody Strode

References

External links

The Final Executioner at Variety Distribution

1984 films
Films directed by Romolo Guerrieri
Films scored by Carlo Maria Cordio
1980s Italian-language films
1980s science fiction action films
Italian science fiction action films
1980s Italian films